Astro B.yond is a Malaysian first high-definition television (HDTV) service from Astro. Launched by Astro on 11 December 2009. The roll out of these services is estimated to cost some RM200 million, including marketing and operating costs of approximately RM150 million, over the next financial year, ahead of revenue and earnings from these services.

Astro B.yond also introduced a Digital Video Recording (DVR) service, available through the Astro B.yond Personal Video Recorder (PVR) and an external hard disk drive connected to the Astro B.yond decoder. The Astro B.yond PVR comes with an inbuilt 500GB hard disk and allows customers to record up to two live programmes at the same time, rewind and pause live TV. Recording services is also available through Astro B.yond via a compatible external hard disk drive and activation of the recording service by Astro.

On 14 July 2010, Samsung and Astro bring high-definition (HD) viewing experience into Malaysian homes. The latest Astro B.yond PVR box is a rebranded Samsung GX-AS731SK.

In April 2011, Astro B.yond introduced its Internet Protocol television (IPTV) services through a collaboration with Maxis Berhad to deliver IPTV. Since December 2010, this provides a wide choice of Astro channels in HD with personal video recording and video on demand (VOD) services delivered via Maxis fibre broadband. Astro B.yond IPTV will be progressively available in Klang Valley and Penang. At present, the Astro B.yond IPTV is available at 60 high-rise condominiums within Mont Kiara, KLCC, Bangsar and Penang.

See also 
 Television in Malaysia
 Digital television in Malaysia

References

External links 
 Official website
 On Demand website

2009 establishments in Malaysia
Television in Malaysia
Astro Malaysia Holdings
Satellite television